Piotr Witkowski (born December 12, 1988 in Gdańsk) – Polish film, television, theater and dubbing actor.

Life and career 
In 2010, he collaborated with the Chorea theater in Łódź. In 2011, he graduated from the Acting Department of the State Film, Television and Theater School in Łódź. Since 2012, he has been performing at the Wybrzeże Theater in Gdańsk. In 2019, he played the main role in the film by Michał Węgrzyn "Proceder", telling about the life of the tragically deceased rapper Tomasz Chada.

In 2020 he won an award "Pomorski Sztorm" in the plebiscite of "Gazeta Wyborcza Trójmiasto" and the local government of the Pomeranian Voivodeship in the category : Discovery Of The Year

In 2020 Tarnow Film Award Distinction for " the actor's persistence in trying to convey the full truth about the character of rapper Tomasz Chada"

In 2021 he won an award for best actor in All In at Krimson Horyzon International Film Festiva

In 2022  at  Rabat Comedy International Film Festival -The Best Actor Prize was awarded to actor Piotr Witkowski in the role of Virus in the Polish film Allin by director Michał Węgrzyn

Now he becomes known all over the world thanks to the first Polish drama series about drag queen made for Netflix - The Queen. Main role  of Loretta plays Andrzej Seweryn

One of the new films (Funeralia) in which he played with Piotr Głowacki takes part in the Gdynia Film Festival

Filmography 
 2011: Plebania – Szymon
 2012: Supermarket – Andrzej
 2013: Wałęsa. Człowiek z nadziei – Shipyard worker at the gate
 2013: Czas honoru
 2014: Miasto 44 – boy with a bucket
 2015: Zbrodnia II season– TV Reporter
 2015: Heimat ist kein ort – Krzysztof
 2016–2018: Barwy Szczęścia – Michał Grzybowski, Maya's father
 2017: Niania w wielkim mieście – Filip, camera operator
 2017–2018: Na Wspólnej – Bartek Drzewiecki
 2018: Trzech znanych P. – Wojtek
 2018–2019: Ślad – Bartosz Majski
 2018: Podatek od miłości – Father of child
 2018: Kamerdyner – Equestrian messenger
 2018: Dywizjon 303. Historia prawdziwa – Johann Behr
 2018: Diablo – Pejolt
 2019: Solid Gold – policeman Adam
 2019: Proceder – Tomasz Chada
 2019: Egzamin – artist
 2020: Champion- Walter
 2021: Krime story. Love story – "Szybki"
 2021: Klangor – Krzysztof Ryszka
 2021: Bartkowiak – "Szakal"
 2021 Der Masuren -Krimi - Felix
 2021 The End -Sebastian Stec
 2021 Other people - Danny
 2021 Funeralia
 2021 Gierek - Oldman
 2021 Erotica 2022 - Dealer
 2021 Układ - Marek Araszkiewicz
 2021 Escape Attempt - Hayra
 2021 Allin - Wirus
 2022 Queen - Bruno Adamski
 2022 Lesson Plan - Damian Nowicki
 2022 A night at the kindergarten - Eryk
2023 All that sex
 Dubbing
 PUCCA – different characters
 Kotek Gapcio – Tasia
 Danger mouse – Krumhorn, Megazłom, Kamenbercik
 Pirackie potyczki – Pieprz
 Wolfblood – Aran, prisoner
 Dance academy – Ethan Karamakov
 Postman Pat – Alf Thompson, Bill Thompson, Michael Lam
 H2O – Just add water– Zane Bennett (second version of dubbing)
 Teletubbies
 She-Hulk: Attorney at law -Luke Jacobson
 Avatar - Jake Sully

Source:

Theater roles 

 Broniewski – Aleksander Wat
 Fedra – Panope
 Karmaniola czyli od sasa do lasa – The son of Maciej I.
 Przygody Koziołka Matołka – Goat, Officer 2, Cobbler,Johnny, Wader, Te
 Śmierć białej pończochy – Warriors, Lithuanian envoys, Hammers, Crossbowmen, Stranglers
 Wesołe kumoszki z Windsoru – Dr. Caius, French medic
Source

School performances and etudes 

 2008: Winnie the Pooh
 2009: Apartment 14
 2011: Marriage– Kaczkariow
 2011: The drama of a district performer – Ilia Afanasiewicz Szamrajew
 2014: From the stage – Aleks
 2017: Behind the window – friend
 2022 Sabina
Source

Performance of musical works

Proceder 

 Szacunek – made personally
 Na tych osiedlach – made personally
 Czarne słońce – made personally
 Intro Proceder – made personally
 Chada L – made personally
 Działam po swojemu – wykonanie

Reviews of films and acting 
Review of Proceder

Review of Proceder2

Review of Mistrz/Champion

Review of The End

Review of Klangor

References 

Polish male actors
Polish male stage actors
Polish male television actors
Polish male voice actors
1988 births
Living people